Dunmurry railway station is located in the townland of Dunmurry in west Belfast, County Antrim, Northern Ireland. The Ulster Railway station opened on 12 August 1839. It lies between the centres of Belfast and Lisburn, thus making it a busy commuter station during peak hours.

Connections

Service

Extra services operate at peak times, and the service reduces to hourly operation in the evenings.

On Sundays there is an hourly service in each direction.

References

External links

Railway stations in County Antrim
Railway stations served by NI Railways
Railway stations in Northern Ireland opened in 1839